Eight ships used in the service of the United States or of the Colonial Forces of the United States Revolutionary War (six of which were United States Navy ships) have been named Enterprise with a ninth currently under construction:

See also
  – U.S. Navy training facility and simulator (2005–2011)
 USS Enterprise (disambiguation) – includes non-military ships, aircraft, and spacecraft named USS Enterprise
  – ships of the British Royal Navy named HMS Enterprise 
 Enterprise (disambiguation) § Vessels – other vessels named Enterprise

References

United States Navy ship names